The coat of arms of Picardy quarters the old royal coat of arms of France (blue with three gold fleurs-de-lis) with three red lions on silver. The flag looks the same but in rectangular form, it is a banner of arms.

History
The origin of the coat of arms is uncertain, but it is certified in 1640.
Fleur-de-lys symbolizing belonging to the Kingdom of France, lions reminiscent of Picardy's ties with northern provinces: Flanders, Brabant, Hainaut and Luxembourg.

The flag thus created was never the flag of the Picardy Regional Council, which preferred a stylized design referring to three departments: Aisne, Oise and Somme. The flag of the Regional Council was displayed on its buildings. However, the flag referring to the Picardy coat of arms is used during cultural or recreational events by individuals and even some communities.

References

 
Picardy
Picardy
Picardy